Catherine Seaton Skirving (Ewart), (10 March 1818 – 7 May 1897), was a noted Canadian philanthropist and volunteer. She was born in Musselburgh, Scotland and arrived in Upper Canada with her family in 1833.

In 1846 she became the daughter in law of John Ewart, a noted Toronto architect, marrying his son, Thomas Ewart, a rising barrister. He became the law partner of Oliver Mowat, a Prime Minister of Canada. She was the mother of John Skirving Ewart, a noted Canadian lawyer and author.

Catherine was involved in many worthy causes including serving for many years as president of the Woman's Foreign Missionary Society of the Presbyterian Church. She died in Toronto, Canada.

External links 
 Biography at the Dictionary of Canadian Biography Online

Scottish emigrants to pre-Confederation Ontario
Canadian philanthropists
1818 births
1897 deaths
Canadian women philanthropists
19th-century philanthropists
19th-century women philanthropists